Helmut Enrique Gutiérrez Zapana (born July 2, 1984) is a Bolivian footballer, who currently plays for Oriente Petrolero in the Bolivian Primera División.

Club career
The midfielder previously playing for La Paz, Real Potosí, Nacional Potosí and Blooming.

International career
Gutiérrez made his debut in the Bolivia national team on September 9, 2009 during a 2010 World Cup Qualifying game at home against Ecuador.

References

External links
 

1987 births
Living people
Footballers from La Paz
Bolivian footballers
Bolivia international footballers
Association football midfielders
Club Real Potosí players
Nacional Potosí players
La Paz F.C. players
Club Blooming players